is a railway station on the Hidaka Main Line in Mukawa, Hokkaidō, Japan, operated by the Hokkaido Railway Company (JR Hokkaido).

Some trains pass through this station, but a total of 12 trains stop here each day.

2021 In July, JR Hokkaido notified Mukawa Town of its intention to abolish this station. , agreed with the residents to abolish this station. According to a JR survey, the average number of passengers per day at the station was 2 from 2016 to 2020, and 1 in 2021. According to Mukawa Mayor Yoshiyuki Takenaka, he revealed at the regular town assembly that JR Hokkaido told him that the station was scheduled to be abolished on April 1, 2023.

References

Railway stations in Hokkaido Prefecture
Railway stations in Japan opened in 1959